Hélène Goudin (born 25 November 1956 in Brussels) is a Swedish politician and former Member of the European Parliament for the June List; part of the Independence and Democracy group.

Goudin was Vice Chair of the ACP-EU Joint Parliamentary Assembly and Co-President and Treasurer of the EUDemocrats - Alliance for a Europe of Democracies.

External links 
Hélène Goudin at the European Parliament 

1956 births
Living people
Politicians from Brussels
June List MEPs
MEPs for Sweden 2004–2009
21st-century women MEPs for Sweden
Swedish people of Belgian descent